"Playboy" is a song by American singer Trey Songz, released as the second single from Tremaine the Album, on February 14, 2017.

Composition
"Playboy" is an R&B slow jam, described as having 90s slow jam vibes", and was written by Songz and produced by Rico Love, Earl & E and D-Town. On the song he depicts the main theme of the album Tremaine, lamenting his inability to change his playboy lifestyle for a romantic one, singing "Don't know why I'm still kissing girls that I don't love, still stumbling out of these clubs, still I'm just so hard to trust, don't know why I'm still a playboy".

Critical reception
Revolt's Maurita Salkey said that it has a "smooth R&B style and vocals, powered with his usual theme of love, sex, and passion. [...] Trey expresses his feelings on finding true love and slowly wanting to change his playboy ways [...] deliver[ing] a much more mature sound in which fans will be appreciative of". John Kennedy of Vibe called the song "conflicted", praising its 90s slow jam vibes and exquisite falsetto". Maeve McDermott of USA Today commended the song, stating that on the song while "hint[ing] at his lothario status, Songz promises he's a better man than his behavior makes him seem".

Music video
The music video was directed by Songz along with YashXana, and released the same day as the song. Trey Songz is shown surrounded by multiple women that touch and kiss him, while he remains visibly apathetic to the situation and pensive, showing his thoughts in other scenes in which he is happy and being intimate with a single woman, remaining, however, at the end of the video, in a bed surrounded by numerous sleeping women, with an expression of reflection and emptiness.

References

2017 singles
2017 songs
Atlantic Records singles
Songs written by Trey Songz
Trey Songz songs